Takonkiet Viravan is a Thai television and stage producer and director, and a business executive at media conglomerate GMM Grammy. He began directing television dramas and sitcoms in the 1990s, and founded Grammy subsidiary production companies Exact and Scenario. In the 2000s, he began branching into musical theatre, building the 1,500-plus-seat Muangthai Rachadalai Theatre to stage his own as well as international productions.

References

Takonkiet Viravan
Takonkiet Viravan
Takonkiet Viravan
Takonkiet Viravan
Year of birth missing (living people)
Living people